Staffan Lidbeck (born 12 June 1968) is a Swedish equestrian. He competed in two events at the 1992 Summer Olympics.

References

1968 births
Living people
Swedish male equestrians
Olympic equestrians of Sweden
Equestrians at the 1992 Summer Olympics
Sportspeople from Stockholm